Scott Eaton is an American artist, designer, and photographer. His work explores the representation of the human figure through various mediums – drawing, sculpture, photography, and generative AI. Eaton received his master's degree from the MIT Media Lab and subsequently studied academic drawing and sculpture in Florence, Italy.

Eaton is an artist in the field of digital sculpture and his work combines human anatomy and traditional sculpture techniques with the power of modern digital tools. Eaton worked for many years as an animator, including for Pixar, Disney, Sony, Microsoft, Warner Bros. In recent years he has focused on creative technology, anatomy, and art, collaborating on project with artists and institutions including Jeff Koons, Mark Wallinger, Elton John, the Royal Academy, the BBC, and the London Science Museum.

On 14 September 2014, his sculpture of Amy Winehouse was unveiled at Stables Market in Camden Town, north London. Eaton said the statue was meant to capture her "attitude and strength, but also give subtle hints of insecurity."

Eaton lives and works in London.

Citations

External links 
Official Website

American artists
Living people
1973 births